The 1993 ICF Canoe Slalom World Championships were held in Mezzana, Italy under the auspices of International Canoe Federation. It was the 23rd edition. It was the first time that the Czech Republic and Slovakia competed as separate nations following the dissolution of Czechoslovakia earlier that year.

Medal summary

Men's

Canoe

Kayak

Women's

Kayak

Medals table

References
Official results
International Canoe Federation

Icf Canoe Slalom World Championships, 1993
ICF Canoe Slalom World Championships
International sports competitions hosted by Italy
Icf Canoe Slalom World Championships, 1993
Canoeing and kayaking competitions in Italy